My Kind may refer to:

"My Kind", song by Pitchshifter from Bootlegged, Distorted, Remixed and Uploaded
"My Kind", song by Hilary Duff from Breathe In. Breathe Out.
"My Kind", song by Paul Haig from Coincidence vs Fate